The Salawat Yulayev Award is an award of the Bashkortostan (previous to The Bashkir Republic) established to honour great deeds and services to the Soviet state and society in the fields of production, science, culture, literature, the arts, education, health, social and other spheres of labour activities.

Recipients

1967
 Hadiya Davletshina, Bashkir poet. "In the novel" Irgiz "(posthumously)" (1967).
 Mustai Karim, Bashkir poet. In the first volume of "Selected Works" (1967)

1968
 Husain Ahmetov
 Zainab Biisheva
 Zagir Ismagilov, Bashkir composer and educator.
 State Academic Folk Dance Ensemble Faizi Gaskarov
 Bayezit Bikbay, Bashkir poet, writer and playwright. 1970, posthumously.
 Saifi Kudash

2008
 Arai Kiyokazu, Rishat Mullagildin (project Congress Hall, Ufa).

2016
 Airat Teregulov

See also 
 Bulat Sultangareev Award

References

Awards established in 1967
Civil awards and decorations of the Soviet Union
Bashkortostan
1967 establishments in Russia